Soldier Pass, is a gap at an elevation of 5,479 feet, (1670m) in Inyo County, California.

References

Mountain passes of California
Landforms of Inyo County, California